The Departmental Council of Ain is the deliberative assembly of the Ain department in the region of Auvergne-Rhône-Alpes. It consists of 46 members (general councilors) from 23 cantons and its headquarters are in Bourg-en-Bresse, capital of the department.

The president of the departmental council is Jean Deguerry.

Vice-Presidents 
The president of the departmental council is assisted by 11 vice-presidents chosen from among the departmental advisers. Each of them has a delegation of authority.

Budget 
In 2021, the departmental council of Ain had a budget of 618.2 million euros compared to 572 million euros in 2015.

References

See also 

 Ain
 Departmental councils of France

Ain
Politics in Ain